K. Suchendra Prasad (born 1973) is an Indian theatre, film and television actor. Before beginning his career in Kannada cinema, he worked as theater actor with playwrights such as B. V. Karanth and D. R. Ankur. During this time, he also directed, choreographed, composed music for films, television and radio, and wrote plays.

Known for his work in parallel cinema, he first received recognition for his performance in the 1999 film Kanooru Heggadithi. His ex-partner Pavithra Lokesh and brother-in-law Adi Lokesh are also actors.

Filmography

 Kanooru Heggadithi (1999)
 Beru (2005)...Raghunandan
 Thutturi (2006)
 Avva (2008)
 Varasdara(2008)
 Jolly Days...College Principal
 Bettada Jeeva (2011) ...Shivaramu
 Suicide (2011)
 Gaggara (2011)...Shivadhwaj Shetty
 Shyloo (2011)...Bhaskar
 Ball Pen (2012)...Srinivasaiah
 Bheema Theeradalli (2012)...Shashikant Desai
 Drama (2012)...Shalivahana
 Attahasa (2013)...DCF Srinivas
 Election (2013)
 Madarangi (2013)
 Bhairavi (2013)
 Tony (2013)
 Gharshane (2014)
 Haggada Kone (2014)...Jailor
 Simhadri (2014)...Prakash Gowda
 Kwatle Satisha (2014)... Doctor
 Drishya (2014)
 Raja Rajendra (2015)
 Rhaatee (2015)
 Vidaaya (2015)
 Plus (2015)
 Ganga (2015)
 Vascodigama (2015)
 1944 (2016)
 Badmaash (2016)
 Lee (2017)
 Marali Manege (2017)
 Bharjari (2017)
 Hombanna (2017)
 Raju Kannada Medium (2018)
 Krishna Tulasi (2018)
 Buckasura (2018)
 Kannadakkagi Ondannu Otthi (2018)
 Ananthu Vs Nusrath (2018)
 Kannada Deshadol (2018)
 Chemistry Of Kariyappa (2019) 
 Ammana Mane (2019)
 Face 2 Face (2019)
 Majjige Huli (2019) 
 Aadi Lakshmi Puraana (2019) 
 Ranganayaki Volume 1: Virginity (2019)
 Roberrt (2021)...Thanu's father                          
 Lanke (2021)                                                                                                      
O (2021)                                
James (2022).. as a girl father
''Wheelchair Romeo (2022) as Prasad

References

External links
 

1973 births
Living people
Indian male stage actors
Indian male television actors
Male actors in Kannada cinema
Indian male film actors
Male actors from Karnataka
21st-century Indian male actors